The American Mosaic Journalism Prize is a journalism prize awarded annually to two freelance journalists "for excellence in long-form, narrative, or deep reporting on stories about underrepresented and/or misrepresented groups in the present American landscape". The award is given by the Heising-Simons Foundation, a family foundation based in Los Altos and San Francisco, California.

The American Mosaic Journalism Prize was created in 2018 by the Heising-Simons Foundation. The winners are selected by ten judges who receive nominations from a confidential network of nominators. Winners are awarded an unrestricted cash prize of $100,000 each, making it a larger cash prize than the Pulitzer Prize (which awards $15,000 to winners).

Past judges on the judging panel include Wesley Lowery (2018-2023), Katherine Boo (2022, 2023), Hannah Allam (2018, 2019, 2021, 2022), Stephanie Foo (2020, 2023), Sam Freedman (2019, 2020), Farai Chideya (2023), Cindi Leive (2022), Mirta Ojito (2019, 2021), and Antonia Hylton (2019-2023), among others.

Prize winners

2018 
 Valeria Fernández. Valeria’s selected works for the 2018 prize include “Sara’s Demons Crossed the Border with Her: Where Could She Find Help for Her Mental-Health Problems?”, “He’s Been Deported Twice. This Third Time, His Family is Leaving the US With Him”, and “These Asylum-Seekers are Being Forced to Raise Their Kids in Immigration ‘Jails’”.
 Jaeah Lee. Jaeah’s selected works for the 2018 Prize include “After the Shooting” for The California Sunday Magazine, “What Does It Take to Convict a Cop Who Kills?” for VICE News, and “Why Is It So Hard for Inmates to Sue Prisons?” for Mother Jones.

2019 
 Abe Streep. Abe’s selected works for the 2019 Prize include the New York Times Magazine article “What the Arlee Warriors Were Playing For” and “The Last Best Place” in Harper’s Magazine.
 Rachel Kaadzi Ghansah. Rachel’s selected works for the 2019 Prize include her Pulitzer Prize-winning GQ article “A Most American Terrorist: The Making of Dylann Roof” and “Henry Taylor’s Wild Heart Can’t Be Broken” in Vulture.

2020
 Rebecca Nagle (This Land). Rebecca’s selected works for the 2020 Prize include her Crooked Media podcast “This Land” and her Washington Post piece “Half the land in Oklahoma could be returned to Native Americans. It should be.”
 Darcy Courteau. Darcy’s selected work for the 2020 Prize includes her June 2019 feature in The Atlantic, “Mireya’s Third Crossing”.

2021 
 David Dennis Jr. David’s selected works for the 2021 Prize include his 2020 Atlanta Magazine cover story “Ahmaud Arbery Will Not Be Erased” and his piece “An Ode To the Black Women At Dillard’s” in Gay Mag.
 Michelle García. Michelle’s selected works for the 2021 Prize include her 2019 feature in Adi Magazine, “Hand of Terror”, and “In the Midst of a Border Crisis, Cooking Is About More Than Survival” in Bon Appétit.

2022 
 Julian Brave NoiseCat. Julian’s selected works for the 2022 Prize include “The Census Powwow” in Snap Judgment, National Geographic’s “Indigenous fathers take lessons from their own experience to create healthy lifestyles for their children”, and “The House on Magnolia Street” featured in The California Sunday Magazine.
 Ryan Christopher Jones. Ryan’s selected works for the 2022 Prize include the New York Times pieces “Underground Lives: The Sunless World of Immigrants in Queens” and “‘We’re Going to See What Else the Word Funeral Can Mean’”.

2023 

 Cerise Castle. Cerise’s selected works for the 2023 Prize include articles related to her Knock LA series "A Tradition of Violence".
 Carvell Wallace. Carvell’s selected works for the 2023 Prize includes a profile of Justin Williams in Bicycling and a piece on Medium, “What if My Mother Had An Abortion”.

Prize winner updates

Darcy Courteau (2020 Prize Recipient) 
Darcy published a piece about essential delivery workers for The Atlantic in June 2020.

David Dennis, Jr. (2021 Prize Recipient) 
In June 2021, David joined The Undefeated as a full-time senior writer covering music for the culture vertical of the ESPN multimedia content initiative on sports, race, and culture. 

In May 2022, David published a book with HarperCollins titled, “The Movement Made Us,” about his father’s experience as part of the U.S. Civil Rights Movement.

Valeria Fernandez (2018 Prize Recipient) 
Valeria recently published a personal story for PRI’s “The World” about getting vaccinated for COVID-19 while being pregnant in May, 2021. Additionally, in May 2021, she began airing a new radio show, “Comadres al Aire”. 

palabra., a growing multimedia platform supporting National Association of Hispanic Journalists (NAHJ) freelance journalist members, named Valeria editor in 2021. In January 2022, Valeria was named a Fellow for the Emerson Collective to launch Altavoz Lab, a collaborative project within palabra. to strengthen reporting at community outlets that serve people of color and immigrants.

Michelle García (2021 Prize Recipient) 
In June 2021, Michelle’s piece, “The Media Isn’t Ready to Cover Climate Apartheid”, which was among the pieces featured by the American Mosaic Journalism Award judges, was selected as a winner for the 2021 Covering Climate Now award. 

As of December 2021, Michelle is working on a book titled "Anima Sola" with Viking Books.

Rachel Kaadzi Ghansah (2019 Prize Recipient) 
In May, 2020, Rachel entered into a book deal with Random House. The book, The Explainers and the Explorers, which is Rachel’s first full-length work of non-fiction, will “be a two-volume, broad-sweeping work about the black experience in America, from its very beginnings to the current day,” according to Random House.

Ryan Christopher Jones (2022 Prize Recipient) 
As of April, 2022, Ryan has been accepted into a doctoral program in Social Anthropology at Harvard University. He will conduct visual research on how hostile environments, water, and air are impacting Latino communities across the American West. 

In 2022, Ryan served on the photography jury for the 2021-2022 Pulitzer photojournalism winners.

Jaeah Lee (2018 Prize Recipient) 
In June 2021, Jaeah was named as a 2021-2022 Knight-Wallace Reporting Fellow at the University of Michigan.

In August 2021, Jaeah’s article “Why Was Vicha Ratanapakdee Killed?” was published in the in The New York Times Magazine and in April 2022 Jaeah’s opinion article “This Rap Song Helped Sentence a 17-Year-Old to Prison for Life” was published in The New York Times.

Rebecca Nagle (2020 Prize Recipient) 
The second season of Rebecca’s podcast series “This Land,” for which she won the Prize in 2020, was released at the end of August 2021. The podcast’s second season focused on how the far right is using Native children to quietly dismantle American Indian tribes and advance a conservative agenda.

Rebecca was an awardee at the 2021 Women’s Media Center Exceptional Journalism Awards in December 2021.

Rebecca’s book “Indian Territory” will be published in 2022 under HarperCollins. Additionally, in April 2022, Rebecca Nagle co-authored the article “Where Is Oklahoma Getting Its Numbers From in Its Supreme Court Case?” in The Atlantic with Allison Herrera. The article was cited by Supreme Court Justice Sonya Sotomayer on April 28, 2022, during arguments in the Supreme Court case Oklahoma v. Castro-Huerta.

Julian Brave NoiseCat (2022 Prize Recipient) 
Julian is currently working on a book, "We Survived the Night", which will be published by Knopf and is an account of contemporary Indigenous life in the U.S. and Canada woven together with a personal narrative.

Julian gave the 2022 Commencement Charge of the Class speech for University of Michigan’s Ford School in April 2022. In August 2022, Julian published "Z’s coming out: At a two-spirit powwow in Toronto, my niece grapples with identity" in Canada's National Observer.

Abraham “Abe” Streep (2019 Prize Recipient) 
In May 2021, Abe published a piece in The New Yorker exploring how violent police officers remain in law enforcement.

In September 2021, Abe published his book "Brothers on Three" with MacMillan Publishers. The book is an expansion on one of the pieces Abe won the Prize for in 2019, “What the Arlee Warriors Were Playing For”, and is the story of coming of age on Montana’s Flathead Indian Reservation and a basketball team uniting a community during a suicide epidemic. "Brothers on Three" won the 2021 Montana Book Award, and the 2021 New Mexico-Arizona General Nonfiction Book Award.

See also 
 List of American Journalism Awards

References

External Links 

 Official American Mosaic Journalism Prize website
 Heising-Simons Foundation website

Awards established in 2018
Journalism awards
American awards